Shia (Shia) refers to the second largest denomination of Islam.

Shia or Shias may also refer to:

Places
 Shia, Ghana, a village in the Volta Region of Ghana

Other uses
 Shia LaBeouf (born 1986), an American actor
 Shia, a character from the manga Pita-Ten
 Soekarno–Hatta International Airport

See also
Shiha (disambiguation)